Han Deqin (8 October 1892–15 August 1988) was a KMT general from Siyang County, Jiangsu. He graduated from the Baoding Military Academy. He fought against the Chinese Workers' and Peasants' Red Army in Jiangxi and the forces of the Empire of Japan in his home province. He commanded Nationalist forces involved in the New Fourth Army Incident during the Second Sino-Japanese War. After the end of the civil war in China, he left the mainland for Taiwan.

References

National Revolutionary Army generals from Jiangsu
1892 births
1988 deaths
People from Suqian
Baoding Military Academy alumni
People of the Northern Expedition
People of the Chinese Civil War